Neville Steedman (born 18 September 1957) was an Irish soccer player during the 1980s.

He represented Thurles Town, Shamrock Rovers and Galway United amongst others during his career. He made three appearances for Rovers in the European Cup and 75 in total.

Steedman had been playing reserve football for Bohs and Athlone after his stint at Thurles when he was contacted by Jim McLaughlin (football manager). He signed for the Glenmalure Park club in 1983 making his debut in a Dublin City Cup game on 2 September. On 22 August 1984 in a LFA President's Cup final he took over from injured goalkeeper Jody Byrne as Rovers won the first trophy of the season.

Spent the 1985/86 season at Galway United before moving back to the Hoops.

Scored the last ever goal at Milltown in a reserve Cup game win on 19 May 1987.

An all rounder Steedman played rugby and cricket at a senior level and is now an accomplished golfer.

Honours
 League of Ireland: 
 Shamrock Rovers 1983/84
LFA President's Cup
 Shamrock Rovers 1984/85
 Dublin City Cup
 Shamrock Rovers 1983/84

Sources
 The Hoops by Paul Doolan and Robert Goggins
 The Four-in-a-Row Story by Robert Goggins

Republic of Ireland association footballers
League of Ireland players
Shamrock Rovers F.C. players
Galway United F.C. players
Athlone Town A.F.C. players
Bohemian F.C. players
Living people
1957 births
Association footballers not categorized by position